David S. Adams is a Professor of Biology at Worcester Polytechnic Institute.

Education
In 1974, Adams received his BS in physiology from Oklahoma State University.
In 1976, he obtained his MS in Biophysical Sciences from the University of Houston.
In 1979, he obtained his PhD Molecular Biology from the University of Texas.
From 1979 to 1984 Adams received his Postdoc in Molecular Biology from Rockefeller University, New York City.

Alzheimer's Disease research
In 1995, he was the first person to successfully replicate Alzheimer's disease in a mouse. His work in the field suggests that an over-abundance of protein production causes the disease, as opposed to "twists" in neurons, as is alternately argued. The finding remains one of the most significant discoveries in Alzheimer's research to date.

Worcester Polytechnic Institute
Adams lectures multiple biology classes at Worcester Polytechnic Institute, notably Cell Biology, Virology, and Advanced Cell Biology. He is an avid supporter of abolishing textbooks for upper classes, due to his belief that memorization does not contribute to a greater understanding of biology.

Awards and honors 
He was elected in 2008 a Fellow of the American Association for the Advancement of Science.

Research interests
Molecular medicine
Neurodegenerative diseases
Neurotrophic factors as therapeutics for neuro-regeneration
Mouse models for Alzheimer's

References

External links
 WPI's Biology Department website on David Adams

Year of birth missing (living people)
Living people
Worcester Polytechnic Institute faculty
Oklahoma State University alumni
University of Houston alumni
Fellows of the American Association for the Advancement of Science